Steven M. Paul  is an American neuroscientist and pharmaceutical executive. As of 2021, Paul serves as the CEO, president and chairman of Karuna Therapeutics.

Career
Paul received his B.S. (1972) and M.D. (1975) degrees from Tulane University. Following a residency in psychiatry at the University of Chicago, he joined the National Institute of Mental Health (NIMH) in 1976. In 1982, Paul and his colleague, Phil Skolnick, published their discovery that the ethyl ester of beta carboline-3-carboxylic acid (beta-CCE) triggered anxiety in people; the work was recognized as an example of the growing ability of neuroscientists to understand the biochemistry of emotions. In 1989, he was the senior scientist on a paper published in Nature that undercut the claim that mutations in a gene on chromosome 11 caused bipolar disorder, which previously had been hailed as evidence that studies of genetics would lead to definitive biomarkers for mental illnesses. Around this time, he became the scientific director of intramural research at NIMH.

Paul moved to Eli Lilly and Company in 1993 as vice president for central nervous system discovery research and decision-phase medical research. He was described by a New York Times reporter in 1996 as being "one of those at the forefront of the development of the coming breed of psychiatric medications." In 1998 he was named group vice president, therapeutic area discovery research and clinical investigation, and by 2003 he was Lilly's executive vice president for science and technology and president of Lilly Research Laboratories. He helped organize cooperation and funding from pharmaceutical companies in establishing the Alzheimer's Disease Neuroimaging Initiative, a non-proprietary collaborative research effort to establish imaging biomarkers for Alzheimer's disease.

In the early 2000s, Paul helped lead the company toward a new model of drug discovery and development that focused on getting proof of concept as early as possible in the research process, in order to avoid failures in Phase II clinical trials. As part of that effort he helped establish Lilly Chorus, an autonomous business unit that was created to design and execute studies that would allow drug candidates to "fail early" instead of lingering in a company's pipeline. He also led Lilly's work on Alzheimer's drugs, which however dramatically failed in Phase III clinical trials.

Boards and memberships
Paul is a member of the National Academy of Sciences and the National Academy of Medicine.

As of 2017 he was on the board of directors for Butler University, the Foundation for the National Institutes of Health, and the Eli Lilly & Co. Foundation. As of 2017 he was also on the board of directors of Alnylam, SAGE Therapeutics, Tal Medical, Sigma-Aldrich, Karuna Therapeutics, Voyager Therapeutics, Constellation Pharmaceuticals, the Biotechnology Industry Organization, and DemeRx.

He is also an elected fellow emeritus of the American College of Neuropsychopharmacology (ACNP) and served as ACNP President (1999). As of 2020, he was on the board of directors or is a trustee of several organizations, including serving as chairman of the Board of the Foundation for the NIH (FNIH)  and as a Director of Alnylam Pharmaceuticals, Sage Therapeutics, Voyager Therapeutics  and Karuna Pharmaceuticals. He has also served as a member of the National Institute of General Medical Sciences (NIGMS)

References

External links
 Charlie Rose show on Schizophrenia, including Paul. Part of the Brain Series.  Aired March 30, 2012.

American neuroscientists
Alzheimer's disease researchers
Tulane University alumni
Year of birth missing (living people)
Living people
Members of the National Academy of Medicine